Kyohei Morita (森田恭平) (born 6 February 1984) is a Japanese rugby union footballer who made his international debut as a fly half with the Japan national rugby union team in 2004. He graduated from Hosei University and joined Kobelco Steelers in 2006.

Notes

Japanese rugby union players
Rugby union fly-halves
Living people
1984 births
Japan international rugby union players
Kobelco Kobe Steelers players